John Shadbolt is a politician in Ontario, Canada.  He served as leader of the Libertarian Party of Ontario in the 1995 provincial election.

Shadbolt first ran for the provincial legislature in the 1990 Ontario election, finishing sixth out of six candidates in Halton North with 461 votes (future Family Coalition Party leader Giuseppe Gori finished fourth).  He ran in the same riding as party leader in the 1995 Ontario election, and finished fifth of five candidates with 187 votes.  As party leader, Shadbolt was interviewed by TV Ontario and other political forums in the 1995 cycle.

Shadbolt resigned as party leader on June 9, 1995, and was replaced by George Dance. He has not run for office in Ontario since then.

References

Leaders of the Ontario Libertarian Party
Living people
Year of birth missing (living people)